Pleasant Valley is an unincorporated community in Rockingham County, Virginia, United States.

Geography 

References

Unincorporated communities in Rockingham County, Virginia
Unincorporated communities in Virginia